Concurrent powers are powers of a federal state that are shared by both the federal government and each constituent political unit, such as a state or province. These powers may be exercised simultaneously within the same territory, in relation to the same body of citizens, and regarding the same subject-matter. Concurrent powers are contrasted with reserved powers (not possessed by the federal government) and with exclusive federal powers (forbidden to be possessed by the states, or requiring federal permission).  

Federal law is supreme and so, it may pre-empt a state or provincial law in case of conflict.  Concurrent powers can therefore be divided into two kinds: those not generally subject to federal pre-emption, such as the power to tax private citizens, and other concurrent powers.  

In the United States, examples of the concurrent powers shared by both the federal and the state governments include the powers to tax, power to spend, and create lower courts.

References

Federalism
Constitutional law